Spin Off is a Canadian game show created and produced by Mark Burnett for CHCH-DT. The series is hosted by Canadian comedian Elvira Kurt and debuted on September 11, 2013. The show appeared to only have one season, and reruns air randomly on CHCH overnight and weekends.

Gameplay

There is one contestant at a time, who answers questions in sequence while the results are displayed by changing the colours of wedges on a large wheel.  The game consists of up to three numbered rounds followed by an Endgame round, unless the player is eliminated sooner.  The player "banks" money for correct answers and the amount may be changed by a spin of the wheel at the end of each round.  A player who is eliminated wins nothing.

Rounds 1, 2, and 3

During each round the wheel displays six wedges that can each be red, green, or gold; initially they are all red or green.  A correct answer changes one red wedge to green, or if there are no red wedges, changes one green wedge to gold.  A wrong answer changes a green wedge to red, or if all the wedges were already red, eliminates the player.

With each successive round the difficulty increases, but so does the value of the questions.  For each correct answer in these rounds, the player banks $200 in Round 1, $400 in Round 2, $600 in Round 3.  However, the wheel starts with one red wedge in Round 1, two in Round 2, three in Round 3.

Each round consists of five questions, but if the wheel is all one colour after the five, a sixth question is asked.  Next the wheel's divisions are rearranged into 18 smaller wedges, without changing the relative proportions of the colours, and the player spins the wheel.  Spinning a red wedge eliminates the player, a green has no effect, and a gold doubles the money banked on this round.

If not eliminated after Round 1 or 2, the player has the choice of continuing to the next numbered round or proceeding directly to the Endgame.

Endgame

In this round the wheel again displays six wedges, but they are annotated with outcomes.  Initially there is one green wedge showing the dollar amount banked by the player, and the other wedges are a neutral bluish colour.

After each of the five questions on this round, the player must press a different button from an array of ten: five green for correct answers and five red for wrong answers.  The green buttons correspond randomly to the outcomes ×1, ×2, ×3, ×4, and ×5; the red buttons correspond randomly to ÷2, ÷3, ÷4, and ÷5, and BUST.  As the buttons are pressed, the neutral wedges on the wheel turn red or green and are annotated with the banked amount multiplied or divided by the applicable factor, or with BUST.

Finally the player spins the wheel.  Spinning the BUST wedge, if there is one, eliminates the player, and any other wedge produces the applicable amount of winnings.  A player could theoretically win as much as $60,000 (that is, 5 × 2 × 5 × ($200 + $400 + $600)) by answering all questions correctly in Rounds 1 to 3, spinning gold each time, getting at least one right answer in the Endgame, finding the ×5 button, and spinning the corresponding wedge.

References

External links
Spin Off at CHCH.com from Web Archive

First-run syndicated television shows in Canada
Television shows filmed in Toronto
2013 Canadian television series debuts
2014 Canadian television series endings
2010s Canadian game shows
Television series by MGM Television
Television series created by Mark Burnett